A laminar flow cabinet or tissue culture hood is a carefully enclosed bench designed to prevent contamination of semiconductor wafers, biological samples, or any particle sensitive materials.  Air is drawn through a HEPA filter and blown in a very smooth, laminar flow towards the user.  Due to the direction of air flow, the sample is protected from the user but the user is not protected from the sample.  The cabinet is usually made of stainless steel with no gaps or joints where spores might collect. 

Such hoods exist in both horizontal and vertical configurations, and there are many different types of cabinets with a variety of airflow patterns and acceptable uses.

Laminar flow cabinets may have a UV-C germicidal lamp to sterilize the interior and contents before usage to prevent contamination of the experiment. Germicidal lamps are usually kept on for fifteen minutes to sterilize the interior before the cabinet is used. The light must be switched off when the cabinet is being used, to limit exposure to skin and eyes as stray ultraviolet light emissions can cause cancer and cataracts.

See also
 Asepsis
 Biosafety cabinet
 Fume hood

References

External links 
NSF/ANSI Standard 49

Laboratory equipment
Microbiology equipment
Ventilation